A monorail is a railway in which the track consists of a single rail or a beam.

Monorail may also refer to:

 Monorail camera, a camera whose components are mounted on a rail which allows positional adjustment
 MonoRail (software), an open source web application framework built on top of the ASP.NET platform
 Monorail Inc., a defunct American computer company
 Overhead crane, a type of crane found in industrial environments

See also
 Disney monorail (disambiguation), monorail systems used on Disney properties
 "Marge vs. the Monorail", an episode of The Simpsons
 Rivers State Monorail, a proposed transportation project in Port Harcourt, Rivers State, Nigeria